Véronique North-Minca (born December 4, 1953, Mulhouse) is a diplomat from France. She served as the first Secretary of the French Embassy, Chişinău (2006-2010).

Awards  
 The Order of Honour, Moldova, 2010

References

External links  
 Haute distinction pour Veronique North-Minca 
 Véronique North-Minca. Eleganţă franceză într-o realitate moldovenească 
 Timpul de dimineaţă, Vronique North-Minca, prim-secretar al Ambasadei Frantei la Chisinau

1953 births
People from Mulhouse
French women diplomats
Living people